Fadwa El Gallal, also Fadwa Gallal is a Libyan-American news anchor and journalist. She was born in Boston, USA, to a family originally from Benghazi. She lived in Egypt, where she studied at El Alsson School, then at the American University in Cairo. She worked for Al-Aan TV from 2013 to 2014 before moving in 2016 to work for Al-Arabiya. In 2018, she moved positions to work for Alhurra, a US-based television station that broadcasts to the Arab world.

References

External links 

 Youtube: Fadwa El Gallal

Living people
Year of birth missing (living people)
Libyan American
Libyan women journalists
People from Boston
Libyan television presenters
People from Benghazi
American University alumni